Medbh McGuckian (born as Maeve McCaughan on 12 August 1950) is a poet from Northern Ireland.

Biography
She was born the third of six children as Maeve McCaughan to Hugh and Margaret McCaughan in North Belfast. Her father was a school headmaster and her mother an influential art and music enthusiast. She was educated at Holy Family Primary School and Dominican College, Fortwilliam and earned a Bachelor of Arts degree in 1972 and a Master of Arts degree in 1974 at Queen's University Belfast. Maeve McCaughan adopted the Irish spelling of her name, Medbh, when her university teacher, Seamus Heaney, wrote her name that way when signing books to her. She married a teacher and poet, John McGuckian, in 1977.

She has worked as a teacher in her native Belfast at St. Patrick's College, Knock and an editor and was the first female Writer in Residence at Queen's University Belfast (1985–1988). She spent part of a term appointed as visiting poet and instructor in creative writing at the University of California, Berkeley (1991).

Work
McGuckian's first published poems appeared in two pamphlets, Single Ladies: Sixteen Poems and Portrait of Joanna, in 1980, the year in which she received an Eric Gregory Award. In 1981 she co-published Trio Poetry 2 with fellow poets Damian Gorman and Douglas Marshall, and in 1989 she collaborated with Nuala Archer on Two Women, Two Shores. Medbh McGuckian's first major collection, The Flower Master (1982), which explores post-natal breakdown, was awarded a Rooney Prize for Irish Literature, an Arts Council (Ireland) award (both 1982) and an Alice Hunt Bartlett Prize (1983). She is also the winner of the 1989 Cheltenham Prize for her collection On Ballycastle Beach (Wake Forest University Press).

Medbh McGuckian has edited an anthology, The Big Striped Golfing Umbrella: Poems by Young People from Northern Ireland (1985) for the Arts Council of Northern Ireland, written a study of the car in the poetry of Seamus Heaney, entitled Horsepower Pass By! (1999), and has translated into English (with Eiléan Ní Chuilleanáin) The Water Horse (1999), a selection of poems in Irish by Nuala Ní Dhomhnaill. A volume of Selected Poems: 1978–1994 was published in 1997, and among her latest collections are The Book of the Angel (2004) The Currach Requires No Harbours (2007), and My Love Has Fared Inland (2008).

Recent criticism of McGuckian has pointed to her extensive use of unacknowledged source material, from Russian poetry and elsewhere , a discovery that may have motivated her decision to name (on the acknowledgements page) the primary source for her collection, The Currach Requires No Harbour. This work does features a poem inspired by the lives of the Wrens of the Curragh.

She was awarded the 2002 Forward Poetry Prize (Best Single Poem) for her poem "She is in the Past, She Has This Grace". She has been shortlisted twice for the Poetry Now Award for her collection, The Book of the Angel, in 2005, and for The Currach Requires No Harbour, in 2007.

Bibliography

Poetry collections
 Single Ladies: Sixteen Poems (chapbook), Interim Press, 1980
 Portrait of Joanne (chapbook), Ulsterman, 1980
 (With Damian Gorman and Douglas Marshall) Trio Poetry, Blackstaff Press, 1981
 The Flower Master, Oxford University Press, 1982, reprinted as The Flower Master and Other Poems, Gallery Press (County Meath), 1993
 The Greenhouse, Steane, 1983
 Venus and the Rain, Oxford University Press, 1984
 On Ballycastle Beach, Oxford University Press, 1988, reprinted, Gallery Books, 1995
 (With Nuala Archer) Two Women, Two Shores, New Poets, 1989
 Marconi's Cottage, Gallery Press (County Meath), 1991
 Captain Lavender, Wake Forest University Press (Winston-Salem, NC), 1995
 Selected Poems, 1978–1994, Gallery Press (County Meath), 1997
 Shemalier, Wake Forest University Press (Winston-Salem, NC), 1998
 Drawing Ballerinas, Gallery Press (County Meath), 2001
 The Face of the Earth, Gallery Press (County Meath), 2002
 Had I A Thousand Lives, Gallery Press (County Meath), 2003
 The Book of the Angel, Gallery Press (County Meath), 2004
 My Love Has Fared Inland, Gallery Press (County Meath), 2008
 The Currach Requires No Harbours, Wake Forest University Press (Winston-Salem, NC), 2010
 The High Caul Cap, Gallery Press (County Meath), 2012
 Blaris Moor, Gallery Press (County Meath), 2015
 Love, The Magician, Arlen House (County Dublin), 2018
 Marine Cloud Brightening, Gallery Press (County Meath), 2019

Other works
 (Editor) The Big Striped Golfing Umbrella: Poems by Young People from Northern Ireland, illustrated by Anne Carlisle, Arts Council of Northern Ireland, Belfast, 1985
 Horsepower Pass By! A Study of the Car in the Poetry of Seamus Heaney, University of Ulster, Cranagh Press, Coleraine, 1999
 (Translator, with Eiléan Ní Chuilleanáin) The Water Horse: Poems in Irish by Nuala Ní Dhomhnaill, Gallery Press, 1999

References

External links
Profile. Emory University
Medbh McGuckian's page at Wake Forest University Press
Interview with The Argotist
Medbh McGuckian poems in Qualm
Wake Forest University Press North American publisher of McGuckian
Videos of readings and facsimiles of manuscripts in the Irish Poetry Reading Collection UCD Digital Library, University College Dublin
Stuart A. Rose Manuscript, Archives, and Rare Book Library, Emory University: Medbh McGuckian papers, 1964-2006
Wrapping Our Heads Around Copies of this Book: To Medbh McGuckian at Seventy. Daniela Theinová, ed. Special Issue of Review of Irish Studies in Europe 4.2 (2021), available in open access

1950 births
21st-century women writers from Northern Ireland
Academics of Queen's University Belfast
Alumni of Queen's University Belfast
Aosdána members
Chapbook writers
Irish women poets
Living people
Schoolteachers from Belfast
Women poets from Northern Ireland